is a spin-off of Namco's Tekken fighting game series. It is the fourth installment in the Tekken fighting game series.

Tekken Tag Tournament was released as an arcade game in 1999, before becoming a North American and European launch title for the PlayStation 2 in 2000. The arcade version operated similarly, but ran on a 32-bit graphics engine like Tekken 3. It received upgraded graphics when it was ported to the PlayStation 2. Its sequel Tekken Tag Tournament 2 was released in 2011. A remastered version of the game titled Tekken Tag Tournament HD was released for the PlayStation 3 in November 2011, as part of Tekken Hybrid.

Gameplay 

Continuing the fighting mechanics from Tekken 2 and 3, Tekken Tag Tournament sees players battling in teams of two characters. At any point in the match, the player can hit a tag button to swap out with their other fighter, allowing the resting fighter to recover some lost health. The tag can be implemented in many ways, such as in between combos or utilizing special throws. At times when a resting fighter's lifebar is flashing, that character can be tagged in to be given a temporary boost in strength. Unlike other tag games such as Capcom's Vs. series, players are defeated when only one of their fighters lose all of their health, requiring players to be strategic about tagging their fighters. In the event of a timeout, the team with the most accumulative health remaining wins the round.

The game features over 35 characters that previously appeared in Tekken 2 and Tekken 3. In addition, there is a boss character, Unknown, who is similar to Tekken 3's Mokujin in that she can randomly imitate any character's fighting style, albeit she is able to change her style any time during the fight. The PlayStation 2 version added enhanced graphics and various modes, including 1-on-1 mode, in which players only choose one fighter each, and Team Battle, where players choose up to eight battles and play with the tag rules, with each new character replacing the one that was defeated (the remaining fighter must fight on his/her own). Also featured is the "Tekken Bowl" mode, a bowling minigame where each character has different attributes.

The arcade and console versions of Tekken Tag Tournament differ slightly. The arcade version ran on a 32-bit engine, utilizing the graphics engine of Tekken 3. These graphics ran using the Tekken 3 PCB board, based on the PlayStation hardware. The console version ran on a highly updated engine, utilizing the PlayStation 2's graphics processor. The game does not run on a 32-bit engine, instead running on a new and updated engine highly similar to that found on Tekken 4. The background designs and BGMs differed too, as the console version has new updated tracks, while the arcade version was based on MIDI tracks with an instrumental backing. Unknown is not playable on the arcade version, yet the character is on the PlayStation 2 version. The arcade version also allows players to only select the alternative colors that have been added to the costumes at first, while the normally colored ones are unlocked when the bonus characters are. There are also crucial differences concerning the playability of the characters, as some moves or attacks are much more efficient in the arcade version than in the console version and vice versa.

If Unknown is chosen in the arcade version of Tekken Tag Tournament even though the stages were at random, all of those 8 stages were always Unknown. Completing arcade mode as Unknown goes straight to the credits.

Characters

As the game was made to be a compilation of previous games, the game includes nearly every character from the original Tekken up to Tekken 3, including those who were canonically missing in the current canonical game Tekken 3. All of them have improved appearance and movesets to make them on par with the Tekken 3 characters.

Additionally, the game adds two new characters, both of them being mimic characters: Tetsujin and Unknown. Unknown also serves as the final boss of the game. Both characters seldom appear in future games, with Unknown resuming her role as final boss in the sequel Tekken Tag Tournament 2, while Tetsujin is featured as a boss in the free-to-play Tekken Revolution and the mobile game Tekken.

The only absent characters in the game that were playable in previous entries of the series are the original Jack, the first King, the first Kuma, Marshall Law, Dr. Bosconovitch, and Gon (he is a guest character in Tekken 3 and didn't appear in this game and any future games due to Namco's contract to have Gon present was only for Tekken 3 at that time).

New characters
Tetsujin : A metallic version of Mokujin.
Unknown  : A mysterious woman who is controlled by the "Forest Demon" who resembles a wolf.

Returning characters

 Unlockable 
 Unplayable in arcade version 
 Costume/palette swap

Remaster

Tekken Tag Tournament HD is a remastered version of Tekken Tag Tournament, released in November 2011 for the PlayStation 3. The game comes on the same Blu-ray Disc as the 3D movie Tekken: Blood Vengeance and is accessible if the disc is loaded on a PlayStation 3 (the entire package is referred to as Tekken Hybrid which also includes Tekken: Blood Vengeance and a demo version of Tekken Tag Tournament 2). It is based on the PlayStation 2 version and features updated HD visuals and Trophy support. A limited edition version of Tekken Hybrid was released alongside the standard version, which included an art book, selected soundtracks of both Tag Tournament and Tag Tournament 2, and PlayStation Home content.

Reception

Tekken Tag Tournament received highly positive reviews from critics. It has an aggregate score of 85/100 on Metacritic, and a score of 86% at GameRankings. Jeff Gerstmann of GameSpot gave it a 9.6 out of 10 described it as "delivering the same solid gameplay that Tekken fans crave in large doses" but added "wait for Tekken 4 to find that out". IGN gave it an 8.7 out of 10, praising its graphics and character moves. Prince Paul of GamePro praised Tekken Tag Tournament for its visuals "where you could see individual blades of grass!" In Japan, Famitsu scored the PlayStation 2 version of the game a 38 out of 40.

Frank O'Connor reviewed the PlayStation 2 version of the game for Next Generation, rating it four stars out of five, and stated that "The only thing preventing Tekken Tag from receiving a perfect score is its lack of innovation – it's basically a prettier Tekken 3. However, that still makes it the best Tekken yet."

Frank O'Connor reviewed the PlayStation 2 version of the game for Next Generation, rating it four stars out of five, and stated that "A densely packed, gloriously rendered, and very playable fighting game. Almost but not quite a killer app."

Sales and awards
In Japan, Game Machine listed Tekken Tag Tournament on their August 15, 1999 issue as being the second most-successful arcade game of the month. It went on to become the highest-grossing arcade game of 2000 in Japan. By 2000, it had sold 19,000 arcade units worldwide, including 9,000 in Japan and 10,000 overseas.

The PlayStation 2 version sold more than 400,000 copies in its first four days of release. The game was added to the list of Sony Greatest Hits games on March 1, 2002. By July 2006, Tekken Tag Tournament had sold 1.4 million copies and earned $48 million in the United States. Next Generation ranked it as the 35th highest-selling game launched for the PlayStation 2, Xbox or GameCube between January 2000 and July 2006 in that country. Combined sales of Tekken games released in the 2000s reached 3 million units in the United States by July 2006. It received a "Platinum" sales award from the Entertainment and Leisure Software Publishers Association (ELSPA), indicating sales of at least 300,000 copies in the United Kingdom. The game sold 457,340 units in Japan, 1.61 million units in the US, and 300,000+ units in the UK, for a total of more than 2.367 million units sold worldwide.

The game was nominated for "Console Fighting Game of the Year" and "Outstanding Achievement in Animation" by the Academy of Interactive Arts & Sciences, which went to Dead or Alive 2 and Final Fantasy IX. It was a runner-up for GameSpot's annual "Best PlayStation 2 Game" and "Best Fighting Game" awards, which went to SSX and Capcom vs. SNK: Millennium Fight 2000, respectively. In 2007, IGN listed Tekken Tag Tournament as the 23rd best game on the PlayStation 2. In 2008, PSM stated "Tekken Tag is regarded as the best installment in the series".

Legacy
A sequel for Tekken Tag Tournament, titled Tekken Tag Tournament 2, was announced at the Tokyo Game Show 2010 on September 18, 2010. The game expanded on the original's tag mechanics, allowing for more flowing tag combos and combined moves, inherited some gameplay mechanics from Tekken 6, and featured characters from more recent Tekken games. It was released as an arcade cabinet in Japan on September 14, 2011, with an "unlimited" revision following on March 27, 2012. PlayStation 3 and Xbox 360 versions were released in all territories in the week of September 11, 2012, and a Wii U port followed in November 2012. A free Tekken Bowl app based on the original Tekken Tag's bonus mode was released on iOS on July 23, 2011.

Notes

References

External links
 

1999 video games
Arcade video games
Dinosaurs in video games
Fighting games used at the Evolution Championship Series tournament
PlayStation 2 games
Sony Interactive Entertainment games
Fighting games
Tag team videogames
Tag Tournament
Bowling video games
Video games developed in Japan
Video games scored by Keiichi Okabe
Video games scored by Nobuyoshi Sano
Video games scored by Yuu Miyake
Video games set in Brazil
Video games set in China
Video games set in Japan
Video games set in Mexico
Video games set in Russia
Video games set in South Korea
Video games set in the United States